Maria Garcia (born September 20, 1985) is an American short track speed skater. She competed in the women's 3000 metre relay event at the 2006 Winter Olympics.

References

External links
 

1985 births
Living people
American female short track speed skaters
Olympic short track speed skaters of the United States
Short track speed skaters at the 2006 Winter Olympics
Sportspeople from Los Angeles
21st-century American women